The Humboldt–Toiyabe National Forest (HTNF) is the principal U.S. National Forest in the U.S. state of Nevada, and has a smaller portion in Eastern California.

History
The lands now part of Humboldt-Toiyabe have been administratively reorganized many times, and include parts of several defunct national forests. The oldest of these is Ruby Mountains National Forest, established on May 3, 1906. In 1908, it was combined with Independence National Forest to form Humboldt National Forest. Toiyabe National Forest was established March 2, 1907. It ceased to exist in 1932, when it was absorbed by Nevada National Forest, but was reestablished in 1938 from parts of Humboldt and Nevada. The last major reorganization occurred on October 1, 1957, when Nevada National Forest was dissolved and its lands divided between Humboldt and Toiyabe.

Humboldt and Toiyabe National Forests were administratively joined in 1995. Though managed as a single entity, the two forests remain legally and geographically distinct.

Geography

HTNF is unlike most other national forests as it contains numerous non-contiguous sections scattered across most of the state of Nevada and a portion of eastern California. Seven ranger districts are located in the many mountain ranges in Nevada, from the Santa Rosa Range in the north to the Spring Mountains near Las Vegas in the south. About 11% of the forest is in eastern California, in the areas around Bridgeport and Markleeville, and other areas east of the Sierra Nevada.

The forest lies in 13 counties in Nevada and six in California. The counties with the largest amount of forest land are Nye, Elko, and White Pine in Nevada, and Mono County in California, but there are 15 other counties with land in this widely dispersed forest. Forest headquarters are located in Sparks, Nevada.

Humboldt National Forest section 
The smaller and more northeasterly Humboldt National Forest is located in eastern and northern Nevada, in parts of Elko, White Pine, Humboldt, Nye, and Lincoln counties. The section is named after  Alexander von Humboldt, a nineteenth-century Prussian scientist, and contains about 43.5% of the total area. Local ranger district offices are located in Ely, Elko, Wells, and Winnemucca.

Toiyabe National Forest section 
The larger and more southwesterly Toiyabe National Forest is located in central, western, and southern Nevada and eastern California, in parts of Nye, Lander, Mineral, Lyon, Eureka, Washoe, Douglas, and Clark counties, and Carson City in Nevada, as well as Mono, Alpine, Sierra, Nevada, Lassen, and El Dorado counties in California.  Toiyabe is a Native American name.   The section contains about 56.5% of the total area. Local ranger district offices are located in Austin, Bridgeport, Carson City, Las Vegas, and Tonopah. Bridgeport is the only station that is in California.

Ranger Districts

 Austin Ranger District – around Austin, including Shoshone Mountains
 Bridgeport Ranger District – around Bridgeport
 Carson Ranger District – near Carson City
 Ely Ranger District – around Ely, Nevada
 Jarbidge Ranger District – near Jarbidge
 Mountain City Ranger District – near Mountain City
 Ruby Mountains Ranger District – Ruby Mountains and East Humboldt Range
(formerly Ruby Mountains National Forest)
 Spring Mountains National Recreation Area – Spring Mountains
 Santa Rosa Ranger District – Santa Rosa Range
 Tonopah Ranger District – near Tonopah, Nevada, including Toiyabe Range, Toquima Range, Monitor Range, and Hot Creek Range

Wilderness areas

Wovoka Wilderness

Humboldt National Forest

Toiyabe National Forest

Counties

In descending order of forest land area within the counties:

Nevada counties
 Nye, Elko, White Pine, Lander, Humboldt, Mineral, Lyon, Eureka, Washoe, Douglas, Clark, Lincoln, Carson City

California counties
 Mono County, Alpine, Sierra, Nevada, Lassen, El Dorado

References

External links 

 
 National Atlas: Map of Humboldt–Toiyabe National Forest

 
National Forests of California
National Forests of Nevada
Protected areas of Alpine County, California
Protected areas of Carson City, Nevada
Protected areas of Clark County, Nevada
Protected areas of Douglas County, Nevada
Protected areas of El Dorado County, California
Protected areas of Elko County, Nevada
Protected areas of Eureka County, Nevada
Protected areas of Humboldt County, Nevada
Protected areas of Lander County, Nevada
Protected areas of Lassen County, California
Protected areas of Lincoln County, Nevada
Protected areas of Lyon County, Nevada
Protected areas of Mineral County, Nevada
Protected areas of Mono County, California
Protected areas of Nevada County, California
Protected areas of Nye County, Nevada
Protected areas of Sierra County, California
Protected areas of Washoe County, Nevada
Protected areas of White Pine County, Nevada
Toiyabe, Humboldt
Humboldt, Toiyabe
Toiyabe, Humboldt
Toiyabe, Humboldt
Humboldt, Toiyabe